Patrick James Reading (born 29 May 1999) is a Scottish professional footballer who plays for Ayr United, as a left-back.

Club career
Reading spent his youth career at Middlesbrough, before he joined Stevenage on 31 January 2020. He was released by Stevenage at the end of the 2019–20 season. In July 2020 he signed a two-year deal with Ayr United.

International career
He has represented Scotland at under-21 level.

Career statistics

References

1999 births
Living people
Scottish footballers
Middlesbrough F.C. players
Stevenage F.C. players
Ayr United F.C. players
Association football fullbacks
English Football League players
Scotland under-21 international footballers